Svikiro is a spirit medium of the Shona people of Zimbabwe.

A svikiro is an ancestral spirit primarily known to possess a living human and will give advice based on that communication.

The word comes from the verb kusvika meaning "to arrive at or reach a place". It also stems from kusvikirwa meaning "to arrive upon", as it is believed that the ancestral spirits arrive in the bodies of the mediums.

Other types of mediums (svikiro) include mhondoro which are possessed by the ancestor spirits of the same name. Mhondoro means lion in Shona. It is believed that mhondoro spirits reside in the bodies of maneless lions until they have a host to possess. Mhondoro spirits are royal ancestral spirits of deceased chiefs and kings or any other royals. They are believed to be concerned with matter of the clan and territories including the nation.

Roles of the Svikiro
 they are given leading figure in the community and they deal with the welfare of the community at large.
 they mediates between the spiritual world and the human world.
 they protect the society from disturbing factors. they understand some of the life complications and for the society to maintain its equilibrium ...
 they receives visions and dreams
 makes offerings,
 performs healing rituals
 and serves as a messenger

References

External links
Chloe Frommer, "Bodies, Capsules and Fetishes: The Transfer of Control Over Traditional Medicinal Knowledge in Zimbabwe," Discussion Paper No. 97, Centre for Developing-Area Studies (CDAS), McGill University, 2002
Spirit Mediums of among the Shona
Diana Aureta, "The Mhondoro spirits of supratribal significance in the culture of the Shona,"  African Studies, Vol 41, Issue 2, 1982, pp. 173-187

African shamanism
Shona